Lois Moorcroft (born August 21, 1954) is a Canadian politician, who represented the electoral districts of Mount Lorne (1992-2000) and Copperbelt South (2011-2016) in the Yukon Legislative Assembly. She is a member of the Yukon New Democratic Party.

Early career

Moorcroft was born in Oshawa, Ontario, and grew up in Whitby, Ontario. She studied history at Trent University in Peterborough where she earned a bachelor's degree.

Prior to entering territorial politics, Moorcroft served as a librarian at Yukon College's Whitehorse campus. She also served on the Yukon Employment Standards Board and has held positions on the boards of the Yukon College Employees' Union and the Yukon Federation of Labour. In the 1980s, Moorcroft was one of the parents involved in successfully lobbying the territorial government for a new school (Golden Horn Elementary School) to be built for families and children living south of Whitehorse.

Political career

28th Legislative Assembly

Moorcroft was narrowly elected in the 1992 Yukon election as the representative for Mount Lorne for New Democrats. Moorcroft had campaigned on pay equality for women and the importance of the Canadian Human Rights Act.

In that election, however, the government of New Democrat leader Tony Penikett was defeated and reduced to Official Opposition status by a coalition of Yukon Party and Independent MLAs. As an opposition member, Moorcroft served on the Standing Committee on Rules, Elections, and Privileges.

29th Legislative Assembly

Moorcroft was re-elected comfortably in the 1996 Yukon election, defeating Yukon Liberal leader Ken Taylor in her riding of Mount Lorne. The New Democrats, now led by Piers McDonald, formed a majority government. Moorcroft was appointed Minister of Justice, Minister of Education, and Minister responsible for the Women's Directorate in the McDonald government. It was during Moorcroft's tenure as Education minister that the community school in Old Crow burned down for the second time in 20 years.

Moorcroft was defeated in the 2000 Yukon election by Liberal candidate Cynthia Tucker, when the Yukon Liberal Party swept the City of Whitehorse to form a majority government.

33rd Legislative Assembly

After a decade outside politics, Moorcroft announced her intent to seek the New Democrat nomination during the 2011 Yukon election in the newly constituted riding of Copperbelt South, which included much of her former riding of Mount Lorne. Moorcroft was narrowly successful, defeating Yukon Party candidate Val Boxall by just three votes. Her victory was confirmed in a recount.

Moorcroft joined the New Democrats under leader Liz Hanson in forming Official Opposition during the 33rd Legislative Assembly and served as opposition critic for Justice, Highways and Public Works, and Advanced Education. She was also caucus whip.

During the 33rd Legislative Assembly, Moorcroft took a stance against the Yukon Government's proposal to invest $200 million twinning the Alaska Highway through Whitehorse and opposed any fracking in the territory as a member of the Select Committee on Hydraulic Fracturing. Moorcroft also successfully put forward a motion, adopted unanimously, to make territorial campgrounds more successful.

Moorcroft was once again defeated when seeking re-election, this time in the 2016 Yukon general election. She finished a distant third behind Yukon Party Cabinet minister Scott Kent and Liberal candidate and city councillor Jocelyn Curteanu. Moorcroft was one of four New Democrats to lose their seats on election night as part of the party's worst showing since 1978.

Personal life

After her first political defeat, she also served on the Yukon Electoral District Boundaries Commission and the Yukon Human Rights Commission.

After her second political defeat, Moorcroft was appointed the Returning Officer for thee Liard First Nation, situated near Watson Lake, Yukon. The First Nation had failed to hold an election for its chief and council, whose terms had expired in December 2016. However, in March 2017, it was revealed that Moorcroft had abruptly resigned her position without reason, citing her confidentiality clause. Her resignation put election efforts on hold for the First Nation and led to speculation about her departure.

Moorcroft has lived in the Yukon for more than 40 years, with her husband.

Electoral record

2016 general election

|-

|-

| Liberal
| Jocelyn Curteanu
| align="right"| 425
| align="right"| 34.9%
| align="right"| +18.6%
|-

| NDP
| Lois Moorcroft
| align="right"| 331
| align="right"| 27.2%
| align="right"| -14.8%
|-

|-
|-
! align=left colspan=3|Total
! align="right"| 1217
! align="right"| 100.0%
! align="right"| –
|}

2011 general election

|-

| NDP
| Lois Moorcroft
| align=right| 397
| align=right| 42.0%
| align=right| –
|-

|-

| Liberal
| Colleen Wirth
| align="right"| 154
| align="right"| 16.3%
| align="right"| –
|-
! align=left colspan=3|Total
! align="right"| 945
! align="right'| 100.0%
! align="right"| –
|}

2000 general election 

|-

| Liberal
| Cynthia Tucker
| align="right"| 563
| align="right"| 44.9%
| align="right"| +19.9%
|-

| NDP
| Lois Moorcroft
| align="right"| 422
| align="right"| 33.7%
| align="right"| -6.8%
|-

|-
! align=left colspan=3|Total
! align="right"|1254
! align="right"|100.0%
| align="right"| –
|}

1996 general election 

|-

| NDP
| Lois Moorcroft
| align="right"| 484
| align="right"| 40.5%
| align="right"| +5.7%
|-

| Liberal
| Ken Taylor
| align="right"| 299
| align="right"| 25.0%
| align="right"| +15.2%
|-

|-

| Independent
| Allen Luheck
| align="right"| 166
| align="right"| 13.9%
| align="right"| -8.3%
|-
! align=left colspan=3|Total
! align="right"|1196
! align="right"|100.0%
| align="right"| –
|}

1992 general election

|-

| NDP
| Lois Moorcroft
| align="right"|316
| align="right"|34.8%
| align="right"| –

| Independent
| Barb Harris
| align="right"|202
| align="right"|22.2%
| align="right"| –

| Liberal
| Roger Moore
| align="right"|89
| align="right"|9.8%
| align="right"| –
|-
! align=left colspan=3|Total
! align="right"|909
! align="right"| 100.0%
! align="right"| –
|}

References

1956 births
Living people
People from Oshawa
Politicians from Whitehorse
Women MLAs in Yukon
Yukon New Democratic Party MLAs
21st-century Canadian politicians
21st-century Canadian women politicians